Savannah is a census-designated place east of Denton in Denton County, Texas, United States. The community is a housing subdivision marketed by Huffines Communities and is located entirely within the boundaries of Denton County Fresh Water Supply District#10. As of the 2010 census, Savannah had a population of 3,318.

Geography
It is bordered to the south by land within the town of Little Elm and east within the city of Prosper, Texas.

Education
Savannah is served by the Denton Independent School District. Education is accomplished by Savannah Elementary School (grades K-5) within the subdivision; Navo Middle School (grades 6-8), and Braswell High School.

Previously, it was split between the boundaries of Denton High School (grades 9-12) and Denton Ryan High School (grades 9-12). A new high school opened in the fall of 2016 closer to the subdivision. The typical resident has at least a 12th-grade education, and most are college graduates.

The majority of Denton County, Savannah included, is in the boundary of North Central Texas College.

References

External links
Information and marketing site for Savannah
Savannah Dance: Quality dance instruction in Savannah, TX

Census-designated places in Denton County, Texas
Census-designated places in Texas
Dallas–Fort Worth metroplex